Ádám Pattantyús (born 10 October 1978 in Nagykőrös) is a Hungarian table tennis player. He competed at the 2012 Summer Olympics in the Men's singles, but was defeated in the first round.

References

External links
 
 
 

Hungarian male table tennis players
1978 births
Living people
Olympic table tennis players of Hungary
Table tennis players at the 2012 Summer Olympics
Table tennis players at the 2016 Summer Olympics
Table tennis players at the 2015 European Games
European Games competitors for Hungary
People from Nagykőrös
Sportspeople from Pest County
21st-century Hungarian people